The 2003–04 season in Hong Kong football, starting July 2003 and ending June 2004.

Overview
 In August 2003, Real Madrid C.F. played an exhibition match in Hong Kong.

Representative team

Hong Kong Team

Friendly

Exhibition matches in Hong Kong

Invest Hong Kong Football Challenge 2003

Real Madrid Asia Tour 2003
Although the team of Hong Kong is officially named Hong Kong, it loaned 6 players from Dalian Shide, including Zhang Enhua, Hao Haidong, Li Ming, Wang Pang, An Qi and Li Yao.

References